Love Me, Love Me Not or Loves Me, Loves Me Not may refer to:

Television 
 Love Me, Love Me Not (game show), a 1986–1987 Canadian game show
 Love Me, Love Me Not (British game show), 1988, based on the Canadian game show
 Loves Me, Loves Me Not (TV series), a 1977 American situation comedy
 Love Me, Love Me Not (Singaporean TV series), 2001
 "He Loves Me, He Loves Me Not", a Shining Time Station episode, 1991

Film 
 Love Me, Love Me Not (film), a 1996 Canadian drama film
 He Loves Me... He Loves Me Not (film), a 2002 French film

Other 
 Love Me, Love Me Not (manga), a 2015 Japanese manga series by Io Sakisaka
 She Loves Me, She Loves Me Not, album by Kiss it Goodbye
 He loves me... he loves me not, a game

See also 
 "He Loves Me, He Loves Me Not, He Loves Me, Oops He's Dead!", an episode of Psych
 
 
 She Loves Me Not (disambiguation)